Mexico–Paraguay relations are foreign relations between Mexico and Paraguay. Both countries are full members of the Community of Latin American and Caribbean States, Latin American Integration Association, Organization of American States, Organization of Ibero-American States and the United Nations.

History

Historically, both countries were part of the Spanish Empire until the early 19th century. Mexico was part of the Viceroyalty of New Spain while Paraguay was part of the Viceroyalty of the Río de la Plata. Soon after independence, in 1831, Mexico and Paraguay established diplomatic relations. That same year, Mexico accredited a non-resident embassy concurrent to Paraguay from its embassy in Buenos Aires, Argentina. In 1901, Paraguay established a diplomatic mission in Mexico City with Mexico reciprocating the gesture three years later in 1904. In 1943, both diplomatic missions were elevated to the rank of embassies.

During the presidency of Alfredo Stroessner, Mexico maintained diplomatic relations with Paraguay despite international condemnation of the Paraguayan government. Mexico applied its foreign policy known as the Estrada Doctrine. A few years after the removal of President Stroessner from power; in 1992, Mexican President Carlos Salinas de Gortari paid a state visit to Paraguay, becoming the first Mexican head-of-state to visit Paraguay. In 1997, Paraguayan President Juan Carlos Wasmosy also paid a state visit to Mexico. In 2016, both nations celebrated 185 years of diplomatic relations.

High-level visits

Presidential visits from Mexico to Paraguay

 President Carlos Salinas de Gortari (1992)
 President Ernesto Zedillo (1997)
 President Vicente Fox (2004)
 President Felipe Calderón (2011)
 President Enrique Peña Nieto (2018)

Presidential visits from Paraguay to Mexico

 President Andrés Rodríguez (1991)
 President Juan Carlos Wasmosy (1997)
 President Nicanor Duarte Frutos (2004, 2005)
 President Fernando Lugo (2008, 2010)
 President Horacio Cartes (2014, 2015)
 President Mario Abdo Benítez (2021)

Bilateral agreements
Both nations have signed several bilateral agreements such as a Cultural Agreement; Agreement of Cooperation between Bancomext and the Paraguayan General Directorate of Promotion of Exports and Investments; Agreement of Cooperation in the fight against Illicit Trafficking and abuse of Narcotic Drugs, Psychotropic Substances, Control of Chemical Precursors and related Crimes; Academic Cooperation between both Foreign Ministries; Agreement for the Reciprocal Granting of Work Permits in favor of Spouses and Minor Children of the Respective Diplomatic or Consular Mission Officials; Suppression of Visas in Diplomatic and Official Passports and an Agreement for Scientific and Technical Cooperation in Health Matters between the Mexican Institute for Social Security and Services for State Workers and the Paraguayan Ministry of Public Health and Social Welfare.

Trade
In 2018, two-way trade between both nations amounted to US$166 million. Mexico's main exports to Paraguay include: tractors, automobile parts, beer, tequila, cement and machinery. Paraguay's main exports to Mexico include: tung oil, sugar, cassava, fruits and textiles. Since 2013, both nations have been negotiating a free trade agreement with one another. Mexican multinational company Grupo Bimbo operates in Paraguay.

Resident diplomatic missions
 Mexico has an embassy in Asunción.
 Paraguay has an embassy in Mexico City.

References

 
Paraguay
Bilateral relations of Paraguay